Hyperdynamic precordium is a condition where the precordium (the area of the chest over the heart) moves too much (is hyper dynamic) due to some pathology of the heart.  This problem can be hypertrophy of the ventricles, tachycardia, or some other heart problem.

Hyperdynamic precordium can also be due to hyperthyroidism, and thus indicates an increased cardiac contractility, with systolic hypertension. It may also be due to aortic coarctation, and most other congenital heart malformations.

Palpation of the chest wall can be done to assess volume changes within the heart. A hyperdynamic precordium reflects a large volume change.

References

Heart diseases